Lara Elizabeth Montecalvo (née Lara Elizabeth Ewens, born 1974) is an American lawyer from Rhode Island who is a United States circuit judge of the United States Court of Appeals for the First Circuit.

Early life and education 

Born Lara Elizabeth Ewens in 1974 in Syracuse, New York, Montecalvo received her Bachelor of Arts from Swarthmore College in 1996 and her Juris Doctor from Boston College Law School in 2000.

Career 

Montecalvo started her legal career as a trial attorney in the United States Department of Justice Tax Division from 2000 to 2004. From 2004 to 2020, she served as an assistant public defender in the Rhode Island Public Defender's Office; she served in multiple roles within the office including as a trial attorney from 2004 to 2010, as an appellate attorney from 2010 to 2014 and as chief of the appellate division from 2014 to 2020. In March 2020, Montecalvo was nominated by Rhode Island Governor Gina Raimondo to serve as the Public Defender of Rhode Island and has served since that appointment.

Federal judicial service 

On April 27, 2022, President Joe Biden announced his intent to nominate Montecalvo to serve as a United States circuit judge of the United States Court of Appeals for the First Circuit. Her nomination was praised by Senators Jack Reed and Sheldon Whitehouse. On May 19, 2022, her nomination was sent to the Senate. President Biden nominated Montecalvo to the seat to be vacated by Judge O. Rogeriee Thompson, who would assume senior status upon confirmation of a successor. On May 25, 2022, a hearing on her nomination was held before the Senate Judiciary Committee. On June 16, 2022, her nomination was reported out of committee by a 12–10 vote. On September 13, 2022, the United States Senate invoked cloture on her nomination by a 51–45 vote. On September 14, 2022, her nomination was confirmed by a 52–47 vote. Montecalvo is the sixth public defender nominated by President Biden to be confirmed as a U.S. circuit judge, handing Biden the record for placing the most nominees with that kind of experience onto the circuit courts. She received her judicial commission on September 20, 2022.

Personal life 

Montecalvo lives in Barrington, Rhode Island, with her husband, Craig V. Montecalvo, and their son.

References

External links 

1974 births
Living people
20th-century American women lawyers
20th-century American lawyers
21st-century American judges
21st-century American women lawyers
21st-century American lawyers
21st-century American women judges
American women lawyers
Boston College Law School alumni
Judges of the United States Court of Appeals for the First Circuit
People from Syracuse, New York
Public defenders
Swarthmore College alumni
United States court of appeals judges appointed by Joe Biden
United States Department of Justice lawyers